Michael Glen Dunn (born May 23, 1985) is an American former professional baseball pitcher. He played for the New York Yankees, Atlanta Braves, Florida / Miami Marlins and Colorado Rockies.

Career
Dunn played collegiate baseball for the College of Southern Nevada from 2003 to 2005.  He was drafted by the Houston Astros in 14th round (419th overall) of the 2003 Major League Baseball draft, but did not sign.

New York Yankees
He was drafted by the New York Yankees in the 33rd round (999th overall) of the 2004 Major League Baseball draft and signed.

Dunn was initially an outfielder, but the Yankees converted him into a pitcher.  He made his minor league debut in 2006, pitching for both the GCL Yankees and the Staten Island Yankees. Dunn spent the entire 2007 season with the Charleston RiverDogs, going 12–5 with a 3.42 ERA.

Dunn spent the majority of the 2008 season in single A, playing for the Tampa Yankees, going 4–7 in 30 games. He also played in 1 game in 2008 with the Trenton Thunder Double-A team.

Dunn was added to the Yankees' 40-man roster following the 2008 season to protect him from the Rule 5 draft.  He pitched in 2009 for the Triple-A Scranton/Wilkes-Barre Yankees, until, on September 1, he was called up to the major leagues for the first time. He made his major league debut on September 4, 2009, against the Toronto Blue Jays.

Atlanta Braves
On December 22, 2009, the New York Yankees traded Dunn, OF Melky Cabrera and pitching prospect Arodys Vizcaíno to re-acquire Javier Vázquez from the Braves with LHP Boone Logan.

Florida/Miami Marlins
On November 16, 2010, Dunn was traded to the Florida Marlins with Omar Infante for Dan Uggla.

On April 29, 2012, Dunn was optioned to Triple-A New Orleans to make room for Dan Jennings on the active roster. Dunn was 0–0 with a 9.53 ERA and 9 strikeouts in 5 innings.

On May 11, 2012, Dunn was called up by the Marlins. On May 24, he was sent back down after 4 appearances. He was called up again on June 21, after the Marlins sent Chris Hatcher to the minors.

On February 8, 2015, Dunn and the Marlins agreed to a $5.8 million, two-year contract.

Colorado Rockies
On December 15, 2016, Dunn signed a three-year, $19 million contract with the Colorado Rockies. In his first season in Colorado, Dunn pitched in 68 games, collecting an ERA of 4.47 in 50 innings. In 2018, his season was cut short due to injury, only pitching in 25 games.

On June 19, 2019, the Rockies designated Dunn for assignment. He was 1–0 with a 7.13 ERA in 28 games. He was released on June 21, 2019.

Retirement
On February 4, 2020, Dunn announced his retirement. He retired in order to spend more time with his family.

References

External links

1985 births
Living people
New York Yankees players
Atlanta Braves players
Florida Marlins players
Miami Marlins players
Colorado Rockies players
Baseball players from New Mexico
Southern Nevada Coyotes baseball players
Major League Baseball pitchers
People from Farmington, New Mexico
Gulf Coast Yankees players
Tampa Yankees players
Charleston RiverDogs players
West Oahu Canefires players
Staten Island Yankees players
Trenton Thunder players
Surprise Rafters players
Scranton/Wilkes-Barre Yankees players
Gwinnett Braves players
New Orleans Zephyrs players